Thomas Milner (birth unknown – death unknown) was an English professional rugby league footballer who played in the 1910s.

Playing career

International honours
Tommy Milner won a cap for England while at Dewsbury in 1914 against Wales.

Challenge Cup Final appearances
Tommy Milner played  in Dewsbury's 8-5 victory over Oldham in the 1911–12 Challenge Cup Final during the 1911-12 season at Headingley Rugby Stadium, Leeds on Saturday 27 April 1912 in front of a crowd of 16,000.

References

External links

Dewsbury Rams players
England national rugby league team players
English rugby league players
Place of birth missing
Place of death missing
Rugby league five-eighths
Year of birth missing
Year of death missing